Soundtrack to the Streets is the second studio album by American rapper and record producer Kid Capri. It was released on November 3, 1998, on Track Masters/Columbia/SME Records. Recording sessions took place at Soundtrack Studios, The Hit Factory and Right Track Studios in New York City, at Westlake Studio in Los Angeles, at Luke Studios in Miami, at Avatar and at So So Def Studios. Production was handled by Kid Capri himself, except for one track produced by Poke and Tone. The album peaked at No. 135 on the Billboard 200 and at No. 25 on the Top R&B/Hip-Hop Albums in the United States. It spawned a single "Unify" featuring Snoop Dogg and Slick Rick.

Track listing

Charts

References

External links

1998 albums
Kid Capri albums
Columbia Records albums
Albums produced by Trackmasters